Janice Rich is a state senator from Grand Junction, Colorado. A Republican, rich represents Colorado's 7th Senate district which includes all of Mesa County and a portion of Delta County. Previously, Rich represented Colorado House of Representatives District 55, which included the communities of Clifton, Fruitvale, Grand Junction, Orchard Mesa, and Redlands on Colorado's Western Slope.

Early life 
Rich was born in Midlothian, Texas.

Career 
Rich is a certified professional legal secretary. In 2003, Rich became a county clerk for Mesa County, Colorado until 2010.
Rich worked for over twenty years as a legal secretary and as a court clerk prior to holding her first elected office. Rich also owned and operated a secretarial and business support service.

Elected official
Rich held two elected offices prior to being elected to the Colorado House of Representatives. From 2011 to 2018, she served as the Mesa County Treasurer. Before that, she served two terms as the Mesa County Clerk and Recorder.

Elections

2018
Rich was first elected as a state representative in the 2018 general elections. In that election, she defeated her Democratic Party opponent, winning 62.64% of the vote.

2020
Rich was re-elected in the 2020 general election, defeating two opponents, one from the Democratic Party and one from the Green Party.

2022
In August 2021, Rich announced her candidacy for a seat in the Colorado Senate. Specifically, she ran to represent the newly reapportioned Senate District 7, which includes all of Mesa County and a portion of Delta County. In the election, Rich defeated her Democratic Party opponent, winning 70.06% of the total votes cast.

Personal life 
Rich's husband is Steve. Rich and her family live in Grand Junction, Colorado.

References

External links
 Campaign website
 State House website

21st-century American politicians
Living people
Republican Party Colorado state senators
Republican Party members of the Colorado House of Representatives
People from Grand Junction, Colorado
Women state legislators in Colorado
21st-century American women politicians
Legal secretaries
County clerks in Colorado
Year of birth missing (living people)